The Global Aviation and Services Group is a Libyan charter airline based in Tripoli and founded in 2003.

History

Global Aviation and Service Group (GASG) is a privately owned airline founded in 2003, acquired its Air Operator Certificate (A.O.C No 08/05) and started its official operation on January 4, 2006 as an international cargo and passenger airline.

Services

GASG operates domestic services between Tripoli and Benghazi and other domestic destinations, as well as international services to United Arab Emirates, Turkey and Belgium.

Destinations

Africa
Libya
Tripoli (Tripoli International Airport)
Tripoli (Mitiga International Airport)
Misrata (Misrata Airport)
Benghazi (Benina International Airport)
Sabha (Sabha Airport)

Asia
United Arab Emirates
Dubai (Dubai International Airport)
India
Delhi (Indira Gandhi International Airport)

Europe
Turkey
Istanbul (Sabiha Gökçen International Airport)
Belgium
Brussels (Brussels Airport)
Ostend (Ostend Airport)

Fleet
The GASG fleet consists of the following aircraft

References
AeroTransport Data Bank

External links
Official website

Airlines of Libya
Airlines established in 2003
Cargo airlines
Companies of Libya
Economy of Tripoli, Libya